Jonathan Tweet (born 1965) is an American game designer who has been involved in the development of the role-playing games Ars Magica, Everway, Over the Edge, Talislanta, the third edition of Dungeons & Dragons and 13th Age, and the collectible miniatures game Dreamblade. In 2015 Tweet released Grandmother Fish, a full-color, full-sized book about evolution aimed at preschoolers. In 2018 Tweet released Clades and Clades Prehistoric, two card games for children and adults which demonstrate the concept of a clade.

Early life 

Native to Rock Island, Illinois, Tweet is the son of Roald Tweet, an Augustana College professor emeritus and local historian, and Margaret Tweet. Jonathan Tweet started playing D&D in the 1970s, when his father gave him his first Dungeons & Dragons game. He then formed his own gaming group by recruiting classmates. Tweet graduated from Rock Island High School class valedictorian in 1983. He majored in psychology and sociology at his parents' alma mater, St. Olaf College in Minnesota.

Career 
Jonathan Tweet and Mark Rein-Hagen founded Lion Rampant in 1987 while students at St. Olaf College. There, they also met Lisa Stevens who later joined the company. His article "Egyptian Magic for Call of Cthulhu" appeared in Different Worlds #47 (Fall 1987), the magazine's final issue. In 1987, Tweet and Rein-Hagen designed the game Ars Magica, a game centered around wizards in the Middle Ages. Tweet left Lion Rampant and the RPG industry in 1989 to start a new career. Tweet wrote Festival of the Damned (1991), an adventure published by Atlas Games for Ars Magica. Tweet continued to run a game for a group in Rock Island, Illinois, and wrote about the game "Al Amarja" in Alarums and Excursions; when John Nephew saw these A&E articles he wanted to publish the game, and the result was Over the Edge (1992), the first original game from Atlas Games. His design on Over the Edge notably involved free-form rules and a subjective approach. Lisa Stevens suggested that Tweet revise the Talislanta rules for Wizards of the Coast and write its first new adventure; this resulted in a revision of the Talislanta Guidebook (1992), which was soon followed by his adventure The Scent of the Beast (1992). Tweet wrote the adventure Apocalypse (1993) for Mayfair Games' Role Aids line. Nephew and Tweet also designed On the Edge (1994), a collectible card game based on Over the Edge. Tweet became a full-time employee of Wizards of the Coast in June 1994, and heralded in new lines from Wizards, the first of which was Ars Magica, recently acquired at Tweet's suggestion. Tweet designed Everway, which was first published by Wizards of the Coast in 1995. After Wizards of the Coast moved away from role-playing games, Tweet worked on Portal, a Magic: The Gathering set designed to help new players learn the game.

Tweet was lead designer on the third edition of Dungeons & Dragons. Tweet, Monte Cook, and Skip Williams all contributed to the 3rd edition Player's Handbook, Dungeon Master's Guide, and Monster Manual, and then each designer wrote one of the books based on those contributions. Tweet oversaw the team designing the Chainmail Miniatures Game, while Skaff Elias did the main design work and Chris Pramas designed the world. Tweet became the head of the miniatures group, and the Dungeons & Dragons Miniatures Game (2003) was primarily the work of Tweet, Rob Heinsoo, and Skaff Elias. On December 2, 2008, Tweet was laid off from Wizards of the Coast.

13th Age a d20 System RPG, designed by Heinsoo and Tweet was published by Pelgrane Press on August 3, 2013. The pre-release version was a nominee for the RPG Geek RPG of the Year 2013.

In 2015 Tweet published Grandmother Fish, a Kickstarter-funded book described as "the first book to teach evolution to preschoolers". While criticized by creationist organizations, it has been praised by science educators.

In 2018 Tweet, along with children's science illustrator Karen Lewis, released two card games, Clades and Clades Prehistoric.  These animal matching games are intended to be used as tools to teach about evolution. Clades Solo, an app version that includes both prehistoric and modern animals, was released in 2019

The third edition of Over the Edge, with a new setting and new rules, was released June 1, 2019.

Religious views 

An atheist since grade school, Tweet has devoted much of his personal website to his views on religion, in particular on the historical Jesus. He also blogs about religion on the Secular Sunday School blog.

Personal life 
Tweet and his wife Tracy moved to Seattle, Washington, in 1994. Tracy died from multiple sclerosis in 2008. He continues to live in the Seattle area with his daughter.

References

External links 
 
 
 My First Gen Con: Jonathan Tweet
 Is Amazon going to challenge Zynga in social games?
 Wizards: Peter on the Cusp, Part Ten.
 Jonathan Tweet Interview, RPG Review, April 7, 2011. Retrieved June 9, 2013.
 13th Age – My D & D Next: An interview with Rob Heinsoo, Jonathan Tweet and Lee Moyer, Obskures, December 17, 2012. Retrieved June 9, 2013.
 "13th Age: The New Tabletop Game From The Lead Designers Of 3rd And 4th Edition Dungeons And Dragons", Forbes.com. May 20, 2013. Retrieved June 9, 2013.

1965 births
American atheists
American skeptics
Atlas Games people
Dungeons & Dragons game designers
Living people
St. Olaf College alumni